The Equatorial Guinea national futsal team is controlled by the Equatoguinean Football Federation, the governing body for futsal in Equatorial Guinea and represents the country in international futsal competitions.

Tournaments

FIFA Futsal World Cup
 1989 to 2012 – Did not enter
 2016 – Did not qualify
 2020 – Did not qualify

Africa Futsal Cup of Nations
 1996 – Did not enter
 2000 – Did not enter
 2004 – Did not enter
 2008 – Did not enter
 2011 – Cancelled
 2016 – Did not qualify
 2020 – Group stage

Results and fixtures

2015

2020

Notable players
 Keny, 2015–2020
 Domingo Manami, 2015–2020
 Muller, 2015–2020
 Roberto Tobe, 2015–2020
 Jorge Akapo, 2015
 Vicente Ndongo, 2015
 Bullicio, 2015

References

External links
 Federación Ecuatoguineana de Fútbol

Equatorial Guinea
National sports teams of Equatorial Guinea
Futsal in Equatorial Guinea